Brenda Patterson is an American blues singer, based in Memphis, Tennessee, United States. 

Patterson, at the time of her early albums, was married to the songwriter Domingo "Sam" Samudio, and was a backing singer for Ry Cooder and Bob Dylan. Her self-titled 1973 album, released on Playboy Records, featured contributions from John Kahn and Merl Saunders.

During the 1990s and early 2000s,  Patterson was part of the Camp Fireboys with Brenda Patterson which changed its name to Cooley's House in 1999. Cooley's House released a single eponymous recording of 16 original songs in 1999. About Cooley's House, Memphis Flyer wrote, "Their first eponymous CD is an eclectic affair, veering between styles as varied as blues, folk, and samba mixed in with the band’s patented light-rock sound. At their best, as on “A Child Twice,” Cooley’s House recall some of the better bands of the ’70s such as America and Christopher Cross. The players are all fine, with guitarist John Sumner and the husky, Lauren Bacall-voiced Patterson the standouts."

Discography

Albums
Keep on Keepin' On, 1970
Brenda Patterson, 1973
Like Good Wine, 1974
The Coon Elder Band Featuring Brenda Patterson, The Coon Elder Band Featuring Brenda Patterson, 1977
Cooley's House, 1999

Singles
"Jesus on the Mainline", 1972 	 
"Dance With Me Henry", 1973  	 
"End of the Road", 1973
"Mr. Guitar", 1974

References

Year of birth missing (living people)
Living people
American blues singers
People from Memphis, Tennessee
Playboy Records artists